8S or 8-S may refer to:

Crazy Eights, a card game
Crazy 8s (band), an American band
Local on the 8s, a regularly scheduled local weather forecast segment
8S, IATA airline code for Scorpio Aviation

See also
8 Seconds, film about American rodeo legend Lane Frost
Crazy Eights (disambiguation)
Eights (disambiguation)
S8 (disambiguation)
8 (disambiguation) for the singular of 8s